On 27 May 2010, the National Sports Council of Malaysia had decided the Sukma Games be held annually with the National Sports Council held the games every odd year in Kuala Lumpur, while the state held the games every even year. It was also decided that the odd year Sukma Games featured only optional sports while the even year Sukma Games featured 19 core sports and 5 optional sports.

The 2011 Sukma Games, officially known as the 14th Sukma Games was held from 2 to 12 June 2011 and featured 19 optional sports, whereas the 2012 Sukma Games, officially known as the 15th Sukma Games was held in Pahang from 9 to 16 July 2012 and featured 24 sports.

Organisation

Venues
The 15th Sukma Games had 19 venues for the games, 17 in Kuantan and 1 each in Temerloh and Pekan respectively. while the 14th Sukma Games had 13 venues for the games, 7 in Kuala Lumpur, 5 in Selangor and 1 in Putrajaya respectively.

15th Sukma Games

14th Sukma Games

Marketing

Logo

The Logo of the 2012 Sukma Games is an image of the elephant, a symbol of Pahang. Besides representing Pahang, the elephant represents the welcoming of the arrival of all participating states from Malaysia. There are five colours on the logo, the black and white represents the state of Pahang,  the red represents the fighting spirit of all participating athletes in achieving victory, the blue represents the sporting and unity spirit of all Malaysians and the yellow represents Pahang as a sovereign constitutional monarchy and the pride, the cheers and the honour of all people involved in making the 2012 Sukma Games a success. Overall, it represents the prosperous Pahang and the welcoming of all participating states and Malaysians to Pahang as host of the games.

Mascot
The mascots of the 2012 Sukma Games is a group of four elephants together as a family namely: Tahan (Father), Puteh (Mother), Rajah (Son), and Teku (Daughter), the four elephants are named after respective mountains found within Pahang. The adoption of elephant, the state symbol as the games' mascot is to promote the state's eco-tourism.

Meanwhile, the mascot of the 2011 Sukma Games is a Malayan tiger named Harimau Muda (Youth Tiger).

Songs
The theme song of the 2012 Sukma Games is "Satu Tujuan" (One Aim).

The games

Participating states

2011–2012 Sukma Games

 
 
 
 
 
 
 
 
 
 
 
 
 
 

2012 Sukma Games only

Sports

2011 Sukma Games

 Aquatics
 
 
 
 
 
 
 
 
 
 
 
 
 
 
 
 
 
 
 
 
 
 Beech

2012 Sukma Games

 Aquatics
 
 
 
 
 
 
 
 
 
 
 
 
 
 
 
 
 
 
 
 
 
 
 
 
 
 
 Indoor

Medal table

2011 Sukma Games

2012 Sukma Games

Combined

Broadcasting
Radio Televisyen Malaysia was responsible for live streaming of several events, opening and closing ceremony of the games.

Concerns and controversies
 On 9 July, 12 Johor women hockey players suffered food poisoning after taking their meals on Friday at the Games Village at Universiti Malaysia Pahang (UMP) including key players – Nordalila Ramlee and Zaimah Mohd Nasir who were recuperate at the Tengku Ampuan Afzan Hospital in Kuantan.

Related events

Paralympiad Malaysia

The 16th Paralympiad Malaysia was held in Pahang from 9 to 14 December.

References

External links
 2011 Sukma Games official website
 2012 Sukma Games official website
 2012 Sukma Games Unofficial Website

Sport in Malaysia
Sukma Games
2011 in multi-sport events
2012 in multi-sport events
Sukma
Sukma